Jacob van Oost the Younger (1639–1713 in Bruges), was a Flemish Baroque painter.

According to the Rijksbureau voor Kunsthistorische Documentatie, he was a pupil of his father Jacob sr. and brother to the painter . He is known for portraits and genre works.

References

Jacob van Oost on Artnet

External link

1639 births
1713 deaths
Flemish Baroque painters
Artists from Bruges